Dzięcioł may refer to:

Dzięcioł (film)
Janusz Dzięcioł (1953–2019), Polish politician

Polish-language surnames